The northern pygmy owl (Glaucidium californicum) is a small owl native to western North America.

Taxonomy
Some taxonomic authorities, including the  International Ornithologists' Union, separate this species from the mountain pygmy owl, the Baja pygmy owl, and the Guatemalan pygmy owl, while others, such as the American Ornithological Society, do not recognize the split and consider this bird conspecific with the group, with the northern pygmy owl taking the English name for them all. Furthermore, if the group is considered conspecific, G. gnoma becomes the scientific name because it is older.  Clear differences in the territorial calls by males are the basis for the proposed split, with birds in the high elevations of Arizona and Mexico giving a two-note call while their more northerly congeners give a repeated single-note call.  Results from DNA sequence comparisons of cytochrome-b have been weak and inconclusive despite being referenced repeatedly as a justification for taxonomic splitting.

Subspecies
There are four recognized subspecies:
 G. c. californicum (PL Sclater, 1857) - Pacific pygmy owl - central British Columbia to southwestern United States and northwestern Mexico
 G. c. grinnelli (Ridgway, 1914) - Coastal pygmy owl - coniferous forests of southeastern Alaska to northern California
 G. c. pinicola (Nelson, 1910) - Rocky Mountain pygmy owl - Rocky Mountains in west central United States
 G. c. swarthi (Grinnell, 1913) - Vancouver Island pygmy owl - Vancouver Island in British Columbia

Description
This owl has a round white-spotted head, weakly defined facial disc, and dark upper breast, wings and tail, the latter quite long compared to other owls. The eyes are yellow and the bill is yellowish-green. The bird has two black nape spots outlined in white on the back of its head, which look like eyes. The mid to lower breast is white with darker vertical streaking. Legs are feathered down to the four well-armed toes on each foot.

Distribution and habitat
The northern pygmy owl is native to Canada, the United States, and Mexico. Their habitat includes temperate, subtropical and tropical moist forest, savanna, and wetlands.

In Oregon and Washington they are known to nest and forage in the center of dense, continuous forests, near streams. An example of their habitat is Forest Park in Portland, Oregon, USA. Their breeding habitat includes open to semi-open woodlands of foothills and mountains in western North America.

Behavior
Males will regularly perch at the top of the tallest available conifer trees to issue their territorial call, making them somewhat ventriloquistic in sloped landscapes, and causing distress and confusion among observers on the ground hoping to get a glimpse. They are incredibly hard to spot because of their size and color.

Breeding
They usually nest in a tree cavity and will often use old woodpecker holes. The female lays 2–7 eggs, typically 4–6.  Nest tree species may include Douglas fir, western redcedar, western hemlock and red alder. Early in the breeding cycle males establish and defend a territory of perhaps 250 hectares (about 1 sq. mi.).

During the breeding cycle the female incubates the eggs, broods the young and guards the nest.  The male hunts, making food deliveries approximately every 2 hours.  The male must feed his mate, the young (typically 5) and himself.  The male hunts from dawn to dusk as the young near fledging, and during the first weeks after they leave the nest.

The young leave the nest (fledge) by making an initial flight that may be a short hop to a nearby branch, or an explosive burst into an adjacent tree where they land by grasping whatever branch is first contacted, sometimes clinging upside-down.  Owls at this stage are sometimes called "branchers" for their clinging, dangling and climbing behaviors.  The second day after fledging, the young gradually climb and fly upward into the forest canopy, where they spend their first few weeks, at times perched "shoulder-to-shoulder" with their siblings, begging for food.

Despite many statements in popular literature, no reliable information exists on the seasonal movements of this species.  It is not known whether these pygmy-owls maintain the same territory or same mate year to year, though these questions are being investigated.  Dispersal of young and influences on their mortality are also poorly known, though barred owls and spotted owls are known to prey on pygmy owls.

Feeding
Pygmy owls are purportedly "sit-and-wait" predators, though they in fact hunt somewhat actively, moving from perch to perch with short flights, and pursuing prey at all levels of forest structure.  They swoop down on prey; they may also catch insects in flight.  They eat small mammals, birds and large insects, and may take a variety of other vertebrates and invertebrates.  Mountain pygmy owls occasionally take prey species the same size or larger than themselves (e.g. California quail); however, small to medium-sized birds and small mammals are the norm. They've been observed eating Wilson's warblers. These owls are diurnal, and also active at dawn and dusk.

References 

 "National Geographic"  Field Guide to the Birds of North America 
Handbook of the Birds of the World Vol 5,  Josep del Hoyo editor, 
"National Audubon Society" The Sibley Guide to Birds, by David Allen Sibley,

External links
 (Northern) Pygmy Owls  Documentary produced by Oregon Field Guide

northern pygmy owl
Native birds of Western Canada
Native birds of the Western United States
northern pygmy owl
northern pygmy owl
northern pygmy owl